Michel Saloff Coste (born June 28, 1955) is an artist and professor at the École des Hautes Études Commerciales, and co-founder of the Club of Budapest France, an international non-profit organisation dedicated to leading citizens into discussing complex global issues.

Early life and education

Saloff Coste was born in Paris. During his childhood, he discovered the paintings of his grandfather Roger Chastel (professor in the Beaux-Arts of Paris). He studied philosophy in the University Paris VIII and followed the lessons of Gilles Deleuze. He attended École Nationale Supérieure des Beaux-Arts in the atelier of Gustave Singier. In 1970, he met Andy Warhol in New York. His photography can be categorised as of the pop art movement and is noted for coloring on a series of portraits of Deleuze and self-portraits.

Work experience
Saloff Coste worked as a consultant in communication, strategy and management, and eventually became involved in more fundamental research on these topics. From 1985 to 1987 he directed a permanent multidisciplinary workshop at the Ministry of Research in France on the topic of societal change. In 1991, Saloff Coste joined Bossard Consultants, a leading European consulting firm, as head of R&D within the 'Bossard Institute', and in 1993 created his own research and consultancy firm MSC ET ASSOCIES (Management, Strategy, and Communication), which specialised in global governance, Information Society and sustainable development. He is a co-founder of "New Cap Invest", a venture capital company dedicated to promoting highly innovative companies.

Research focus and contributions
Michel Saloff-Coste's research focuses on the paradigm shift within the information society that he defines as a 'Creation-Communication society'. He elaborated a structural grid which classifies the evolution of civilization in four waves: 'hunting & gathering', 'agriculture & breeding,' 'industry & commerce,' and 'creation & communication'. He then analysed the interaction between different 'reality fields'. Developing his framework further with Carine Dartiguepeyrou, they articulated together ten long-term visions of the future called 'horizons'.  This collaborative work was set out in their co-authored book Les horizons du futur.

Following Coste's suggestion, the French executive committee of the Club of Budapest developed quarterly one-day seminars which explore the main ideas, places and people that were linked historically to the integral movement. The first day of those “inaugurals days” was dedicated to explaining in general the integral approach, the second day looked at the issue of the integration of the integral approach and philosophy in real life. The third day concerned itself with integral education, exploring the theoretical and practical epistemological question connected with the specificity of the wish to build an integral university. In the fourth day, integral thinking was applied to the analysis of the contemporary, sociological, economical and ecological crises, for which potential solutions were explored. The fifth day looked at sustainable development and what the integral approach can bring in terms of integral ecology, society and economy. The sixth day, continuing the cycle, was more connected with future studies and futurology. It was entitled “Civilization of the future and future of the civilizations”, underlining the necessity to think not only in terms of cultural unity but also of diversity.

The Integral University (Université Intégrale in French) in Paris, which is still in its development stages, follows this cycle of conferences. The idea is to organize one-day seminars on various themes in cooperation with speakers, theoreticians and practitioners. The use of the word integral puts a consistent emphasis on the common desire of being integral, and with this aim in view, the systemic and transdisciplinary approaches are also considered as part of the same quest for integrality.

Exhibitions
Saloff Coste's first exhibition, in 1978, was in the Gallery Maître Alber. In 1981, he exhibited photographs of the Palace and the Bains-Douches in the Musée National d'Art Moderne (Centre Georges Pompidou).

 1978 Galerie Maître Alber, Paris, oil paintings
 1979 Salon des réalités nouvelles, Paris, oil paintings
 1979 Salon de la jeune peinture, Paris, oil paintings
 1980 Exposition Galerie Forain, Paris, electrography and copyart in the pop art idiom
 1981 Galerie Walter Thompson, Paris, electrography and copyart in the pop art idiom
 1981 Centre Georges Pompidou, Paris, photography
 1981 Galerie Viviane Esders, Paris, photography
 1982 Galerie FNAC Etoile, Paris, photography
 1983 Galerie FNAC, Metz, Paris, photography
 1984 Galerie du Centre Kodak, photography
 from 2000 Galerie de L’Enclos, Lorgues, acrylic paintings
 2003 Centre Georges Pompidou exposition Roland Barthes, Paris, photography
 2007 Galerie de l'Hotel Kempinski, Dubai, acrylic paintings
 2008 Galerie Reich, Austria, acrylic paintings
 2009 Galerie de Wels, Austria, gouache
 2009 Galerie Visionairs, Paris, gouache and acrylic paintings
 2009 Galerie Lebenstil, Austria, gouache
 2010 Musée du Papier de Steyrermuehl, Steyrermuehl, Austria, gouache
 2011 Galerie Visionairs, Paris, gouache and acrylic paintings
 2012 Musée du Papier de Steyrermuehl, Steyrermuehl, Austria, gouache
 2012 BJ Art Gallery, Paris, France, gouache and acrylic paintings
 2012 Escondido Arts Partnership Municipal Gallery, California, USA
 2013 Blaa Galleri, Copenhagen, Denmark

Published works
Vêpres Laquées, Baudouin, 1979
Paris la nuit, Balland, 1982
Les Horizons du Futur, Guy Trédaniel, 2001
Le management systémique de la complexité, Aditech Ministère de la Recherche, 1990
Le management du troisième millénaire, Guy Trédaniel, 1991, 1999 and 2005
The Information Revolution and the Arab World: Its Impact on State and Society par Emirates Center for Strategic Studies en 1999
Manifeste pour la technologie au service de l'homme, Institut National Polytechnique de Grenoble, 2000
Strategies of the future", World Business Academy Volume 15 Issue 5 December 19, 2001Trouver son génie, Guy Trédaniel, 2005La société de l'information enjeu stratégique, Revue Agir, 2005Le dirigeant du troisième millénaire, Edition d'organisation, 2006Mimétisme et singularité, deux leviers de croissance, La Revue de Kea, 2006La stratégie créative de singularisation, La Revue de Kea,  2007Le DRH du troisième millénaire, Pearson Village Mondial en 2007,2009Réenchanter le futur par la prospective RH , Pearson Village Mondial en 2009Prospective d'un monde en mutation  aux éditions de l'Harmattan en 2010Au-delà de la crise financière Edition de l'Harmattan 2011Les voies de la résilience Edition de l'Harmattan 2012.

 Films and videos 
 I am just a cartoon, Production Centre Georges Pompidou, 1982
 Bazooka'', Production EAG, 1983
 Séminaire de prospective en Californie, octobre 2003
 Le Père Ceyrac, reportage sur le Père Ceyrac, octobre 2004
 Le dirigeant du troisième millénaire, reportage séminaire à Science Po, juin 2005
 Abécédaire de Michel Saloff-Coste, décembre 2005
 Les enjeux du troisième millénaire, septembre 2007
 Première journée de l'Université intégrale, février 2008
 Deuxième journée de l'Université intégrale, octobre 2008

Gallery

References

1955 births
Living people
French academics
French business theorists
Paris 8 University Vincennes-Saint-Denis alumni